"Let It Go" is the debut single by the pop duo Brit & Alex, which was released on March 3, 2008. The track was written and produced by Ron 'Neff-u' Feemster, who has produced songs for Mary J. Blige and aspiring singer and The Hills star Heidi Montag. "Let It Go" is the lead single from their as-yet-unreleased debut album and is also on the soundtrack album Step Up 2 the Streets. It was released in the UK on a CD1 and CD2 format on April 28, 2008.

It peaked at number 75 on the UK Singles Chart on downloads only.

Track listing

UK 2-track CD single
 "Let It Go" (3:23)
 "Sleepless" (3:47)

UK CD maxi-single
 "Let It Go" (Album Version) (3:23)
 "Let It Go" (Moto Blanco Club Mix) (7:38)
 "Let It Go" (Chris Cox Club Mix) (6:45)
 "I Like Boys" (Chris Cox Club Mix) (10:16)

Charts

References

Brit & Alex songs
2008 debut singles
Music videos directed by Chris Applebaum
Song recordings produced by Theron Feemster
Songs written by Theron Feemster
2008 songs
Universal Music Group singles